Wojciech Repsz (born 19 March 1946) is a Polish rower. He competed in the men's coxed pair event at the 1972 Summer Olympics.

References

1946 births
Living people
Polish male rowers
Olympic rowers of Poland
Rowers at the 1972 Summer Olympics
People from Świętokrzyskie Voivodeship